Felt lichen may refer to:

 Peltigera malacea, felt lichen
 Erioderma pedicellatum, boreal felt lichen